Cotter High School (CHS) is a comprehensive public junior-senior high school for students in grades 7 through 12 located in Cotter, Arkansas, United States. It is the sole high school of Cotter School District. The teacher-student ratio is approximately 10:1. Cotter High School serves the cities of Cotter and Gassville.

History 
Established in 1936–38, the community received funding from the Works Progress Administration to build the high school and its gymnasium. The original facilities continued to be used by the district until a fire destroyed the high school in 1973. The current high school building was completed in 1976.

Old Cotter High School Gymnasium 
The Old Cotter High School Gymnasium, located at 412 Powell Street, is a 1936–38 structure built by Works Progress Administration. The gymnasium served students in the district until the new high school and its gymnasium was completed in 1980. In 1995, the structure was listed on the National Register of Historic Places. In recent years, the facility has served as the North Arkansas Youth Center.

Curriculum 
The assumed course of study follows the Smart Core curriculum developed by the Arkansas Department of Education (ADE), which requires students to complete 22 units prior to graduation. Students complete regular and Advanced Placement (AP) coursework and exams.

Athletics 
The Cotter High School mascot is the stylized as the Warriors and they call their mascot Ralph with blue and white serving as the school colors. For 2012–14, Cotter Warriors compete in the 2A 2 Conference administered by the Arkansas Activities Association.  The Warriors compete in interscholastic activities including baseball, basketball (boys/girls), cheer, cross country (boys/girls), softball, track & field (boys/girls), and volleyball.

See also

National Register of Historic Places listings in Baxter County, Arkansas

References

External links
 

Public high schools in Arkansas
Schools in Baxter County, Arkansas
School buildings on the National Register of Historic Places in Arkansas
National Register of Historic Places in Baxter County, Arkansas
1938 establishments in Arkansas
Educational institutions established in 1938